Udupiddy Girls' College ( Uṭuppiṭṭi Makaḷir Kallūri) is a provincial school in Udupiddy, Sri Lanka.

See also
 List of schools in Northern Province, Sri Lanka

References

Girls' schools in Sri Lanka
Provincial schools in Sri Lanka
Schools in Jaffna District
Buildings and structures in Udupiddy